Demetrius, Prince of the Tatars was a Mongol or Tatar ruler in the second half of the .

In primary sources 

Demetrius was mentioned in medieval chronicles and in a Hungarian royal charter of 1368. According to the Lithuanian-Ruthenian Chronicle, preserved in the Codex Suprasliensis and other codices, Algirdas, Grand Duke of Lithuania, invaded Podolia in 1363 and 1364 and defeated three Tatar chieftainsKutlug Bey, Hacı Bey and Demetriusin the Battle of Blue Waters in 1362 or 1363. Algirdas's invasion was the first military campaign that a European power launched in the territory of the Golden Horde.

According Latopis Nikonowski the battle was in 1363, according to Latopis Hustyński in 1362.

"Lord Demetrius, Prince of the Tatars" (dominus Demetrius princeps Tartarorum) was mentioned in a royal charter, issued 22 June 1368 by Louis I of Hungary. According to the charter, King Louis granted the merchants who came from Demetrius's country an exemption from paying custom duties in the Kingdom of Hungary in exchange for Demetrius's identical grant for the merchants of Brașov who visited the Tatar prince's country.

In modern historiography 
Historian Virgil Ciocîltan describes Demetrius as the "last magnate of Bujak" who emerged in the period of the disintegration of the Golden Horde in the 1340s. According to historian Laurenţiu Rădvan, Demetrius controlled the land between the upper courses of the rivers Prut and Dniester, including the trading ports on the coast of the Black Sea. 
His title "princeps" shows that Demetrius was an independent ruler who was not subjected to the Khan of the Golden Horde in 1368.

References

Bibliography 

 
 

Golden Horde
Medieval Ukraine
14th-century Asian people